Ari Brown (born February 1, 1944) is an American jazz tenor saxophonist and pianist.

Biography

Brown grew up in Chicago and attended Wilson College, where he met musicians such as Jack DeJohnette, Henry Threadgill, Roscoe Mitchell, and Joseph Jarman. He played piano in R&B and soul outfits into the 1960s, then switched to saxophone in 1965. He joined the AACM in 1971, and also played with The Awakening in the early 1970s. In 1974 he lost several teeth in a car crash, and temporarily switched to piano again until he recovered. He played sax later in the 1970s with McCoy Tyner, Don Patterson, and Sonny Stitt. In the 1980s, he worked with Lester Bowie, Von Freeman, Bobby Watson, and Anthony Braxton, and in 1989 he became a member of Kahil El'Zabar's trio.

Discography

As leader
 1995:  Ultimate Frontier (Delmark Records)
 1998:  Venus  (Delmark)
 2007: Live at the Green Mill (Delmark)
 2013: Groove Awakening (Delmark)

As sideman
With The Awakening
Hear, Sense and Feel (1972)
Mirage (1973)
With Anthony Braxton
Anthony Braxton's Charlie Parker Project 1993 (HatART, 1993 [1995])
With Elvin Jones Jazz Machine
Soul Train (1980)
With Kahil El'Zabar's Ritual Trio
Alika Rising (Sound Aspects, 1990)
Renaissance of the Resistance (Delmark, 1994)
Big Cliff (Delmark, 1995)
Jitterbug Junction (CIMP, 1997)
Conversations (Delmark, 1999) with Archie Shepp
Africa N'Da Blues (Delmark, 2000) with Pharoah Sanders
Live at the River East Art Center (Delmark, 2005)
Big M: A Tribute to Malachi Favors (Delmark, 2006)
Follow the Sun (Delmark, 2013)
With Orbert Davis
Unfinished Memories (1994)
Priority (2001)
Blue Notes (2004)
With the Juba Collective
Juba Collective (2002)
With the Chicago Jazz Philharmonic
Collective Creativity (2008)
With Malachi Thompson
Buddy Bolden's Rag (Delmark, 1995)
Blue Jazz (Delmark, 2003) with Gary Bartz and Billy Harper
With Famoudou Don Moye
Jam for Your Life! (AECO, 1985)

References

[ Ari Brown] at Allmusic

American jazz saxophonists
American male saxophonists
Musicians from Chicago
1944 births
Living people
Delmark Records artists
21st-century American saxophonists
Jazz musicians from Illinois
21st-century American male musicians
American male jazz musicians